Winged lizard may refer to:

 Dragon, mythical animal
 Pterosaur, literally 'winged lizard', extinct animal
 Flying and gliding animals#Reptiles
 Draco (lizard)